Andrian Candu (born 27 November 1975) is a Moldovan politician, who served as chairman of the Parliament of the Republic of Moldova between 2015 and 2019. He left political life and went back to consultancy business, where previously he has built a successful career.
Candu served as Deputy Speaker of the Parliament of the Republic of Moldova from 30 May 2013 to 11 July 2014, Deputy Prime Minister, Minister of Economy of the Republic of Moldova from 2 July 2014 – 23 January 2015, Speaker of the Parliament Of the Republic of Moldova between 23 January 2015 – 24 February 2019, deputy of the PDM faction in the Parliament of the Republic of Moldova in 3 consecutive legislatures: 24 December 2010 – 11 July 2014, 9 December 2014 - 9 March 2019, 9 March 2019 – 19 February 2020. On 20 February 2020, together with five Members of the Parliament, Andrian Candu formed the "PRO MOLDOVA" Parliamentary Group, which was later registered as a political party, which he chaired for 1.5 years.

Biography 
Candu was born on 27 November 1975 in Chișinău, Moldova. After Candu finished his secondary education at school No. 25, currently Lyceum "Onisifor Ghibu", Chişinău, in 1991 he was enrolled at the School of Informatics "Tiberiu Popoviciu" in Cluj-Napoca, Romania. In 1994 he obtained a Baccalaureate diploma. In the autumn, Candu was admitted to the Faculty of Law of the university "Babeș-Bolyai" from Cluj-Napoca, Romania. After four years of study, he was awarded a Bachelor's diploma. During September 2007 and June 2008, he studied at the Vienna University of Economics and Business Administration, Institute for Austrian and International Tax Law (Vienna, Austria), postgraduate International Tax Law Program, where he was awarded a Master's Diploma. In 2001, Andrian Candu participated in the "Human Rights and Programme Implementation" course organized by the Institute of European Law in Birmingham, UK. In the same year, Candu obtained a certificate of participation in the seminar "Public administration and individual through the European Convention of Human Rights" held in the UniDem Campus, Venice Commission in Trieste, Italy. A year later, at the University of Western Cape, he was attending the International Academy of Human Rights course, on Robben Island, Cape Town, South Africa.

Professional activities 
In 1998, Candu returned to Moldova, where for four years he was a principal consultant within the parliamentary Commission for Foreign Policy of the Republic of Moldova. During that period, he began to teach international law at the Public Administration Academy under the President of the Republic of Moldova. He worked as a lecturer until 2004.

In 2002, Candu became senior manager of PricewaterhouseCoopers Moldova, where he worked until 2010. He was responsible for managing a wide range of projects in the areas of taxation of individuals and businesses, expatriate tax consultancy, legal advice, and others. For a short time in 2010, he served as general manager of Prime Management company, where he was the leader of a team responsible for the management of businesses in different fields and industries including financial – banking, real estate, media, hospitality, and services. He was a member of the Moldovan International Law Association and CEO of the Moldovan Business People Association. At the end of the same year, he was elected member of the Parliament of Republic of Moldova and member of the Parliamentary Committee Legal, Appointments and Immunities.

In 2012, the National Political Council of the Democratic Party of Moldova elected Andrian Candu as vice-president of the party.

In May 2013, Candu became vice-president of the Parliament of Republic of Moldova, a position he held until July 2014 when he was appointed by order of the President of Moldova Deputy Prime Minister and Minister of Economy. Half a year later, on 23 January 2015 he was elected President of the Moldovan Parliament with the votes of 59 lawmakers.

In October 2017, the Constitutional Court of Moldova temporarily suspended Igor Dodon from fulfilling his presidential duties due to his refusal to appoint the Minister of Defense Eugen Sturza, proposed by the parliament. On 24 October 2017 (for the period necessary for the approval of the Minister of Defence), the duties of the President of Moldova were assigned to Andrian Candu.

On 2 January 2018, the powers of Dodon were again temporarily suspended by a decision of the Constitutional Court of Moldova due to the fact that Dodon has rejected twice the candidatures of members of the government proposed by the Prime Minister; Candu again became the interim President of the Republic of Moldova. On 5 January 2018, Dodon's powers were again temporarily suspended due to the fact that he twice refused to sign the Law on the Suppression of Foreign Propaganda, adopted by the parliament at the end of 2017. On 24 September 2018, the powers of Dodon were again temporarily suspended by a decision of the Constitutional Court of Moldova due to the fact that Dodon twice rejected the candidatures of members of the government proposed by the Prime Minister. On 10 December 2018, he again served as president due to Dodon's refusal to sign 4 laws.

According to the last opinion polls carried out in 2019 related to the most popular politicians of the Republic of Moldova, Andrian Candu is placed by some polls on the 10th position among the politicians which are highly trusted by the Moldovans and by some polls on the 13th position.

On 19 February 2020, Candu, together with a group of MPs, left the faction of the Democrats and the Democratic party. On 20 February 2020 they announced at the press conference about the establishment of the Pro Moldova parliamentary group. On 18 June 2020, the parliamentary group Pro Moldova became a political party with Candu as the president of this party.

On 1 September 2020, Candu was nominated by the Pro Moldova National Political Council as the party's candidate in the 1 November 2020 presidential election. He was disqualified and did not appear on the ballot because of irregularities in a list of signatures submitted to the Central Election Commission.

In October 2021, he left politics, and renounced as president of the PRO MOLDOVA Political Party.

Andrian Candu is fluent in English and Russian.

Publications 
During the period of his professional activities, Candu has prepared materials for publication and publications including: 
 "The contract of sale – the difference between English and the Romanian law", 
 "European Parliament, organization and activity", 
 "International Commercial Arbitration: the difference between Moldavian, Romanian and Russian", 
 "Commonwealth of Independent States, success or failure?", 
 "Abuses of double taxation treaties", 
 "Evolution of tax treaties – country report, Romania".

Personal life 
Candu is married with Zuzana Stasna and has three children, Daniel, Vera and Adam. Andrian Candu speaks fluent in English and Russian.

Honours 
In April 2015, by a decree of the former President of Moldova Nicolae Timofti, Candu was awarded the Order of Honor. The politician has received this state award for appreciation of the contribution to reforms based on European values and standards, for outstanding achievements in ensuring the negotiation, signing and ratification of the Association Agreement Moldova – European Union, for contribution to visa liberalization with EU Member States and Schengen.

In 2018, Candu was awarded by Liviu Dragnea with the Parliament Necklace which is the highest award of the Chamber of Deputies of the Romanian Parliament.

References

External links
 Adrian Candu Blog
 Adrian Candu's Biography on the site of the Parliament of Moldova

1975 births
Living people
Presidents of the Moldovan Parliament
Democratic Party of Moldova MPs
Politicians from Chișinău
Moldovan MPs 2010–2014
Moldovan MPs 2014–2018
Babeș-Bolyai University alumni
Vienna University of Economics and Business alumni
Moldovan Ministers of Economy
Recipients of the Order of Honour (Moldova)